Rawlins is a surname. Notable people with the surname include:

Adrian Rawlins, British actor
Andrew Rawlins, Rhodesian army officer
Chip Rawlins, writer
Delray Rawlins, Bermudian and Sussex cricketer
Dennis Rawlins, American astronomer, historian, and publisher
Horace Rawlins, English professional golfer
John Aaron Rawlins, American Civil War general
Joseph Lafayette Rawlins, American politician and lawyer 
Michael Rawlins, chairman of UK's Medicines and Healthcare Products Regulatory Agency
Monica Rawlins, British artist
Nicholas Rawlins, British experimental psychologist
Pat Rawlings, American technical illustrator and space artist
Richard Rawlins, bishop of St. Davids
Rondell Rawlins, Guyanese gang leader
V. Lane Rawlins, president of Washington State University
Xander Rawlins, British singer-songwriter, 1000 Miles Apart

Fictional
Ezekial "Easy" Rawlins, private investigator in novels by Walter Mosley

Surnames of English origin